Takuto (written: 拓人, 拓土, 拓斗, 拓門, 卓人, 巧和, 焚吐, 寛太) is a masculine Japanese given name. Notable people with the name include:

, Japanese singer and songwriter
, Japanese footballer
, Japanese footballer
, Japanese footballer
, Japanese footballer
, Japanese racing driver
, Japanese badminton player
, Japanese footballer
, Japanese cyclist
, Japanese tennis player
, Japanese former baseball player
, Japanese sport wrestler
, Japanese footballer

Fictional characters 
, a character in the video game Persona 5 Royal
, the protagonist of the anime series Star Driver: Kagayaki no Takuto
, known in English as Tobias, a recurring character in the anime series Pokémon

Japanese masculine given names